Paracobitis molavii is a species of stone loach found in the Little Zab River in Iran and upper Sirwan (Kurdish) drainage [Sirvan (Persian) or Diyala (Arabic)] in Iran and Iraq.

References

molavii
Fish of Asia
Fish of Iran
Taxa named by Jörg Freyhof
Taxa named by Hamid Reza Esmaeili
Taxa named by Golnaz Sayyadzadeh
Taxa named by Matthias F. Geiger
Fish described in 2014